Olympicola is a monotypic genus of gastropods belonging to the family Clausiliidae. The only species is Olympicola olympica.

The species is found in Turkey.

References

Clausiliidae